Edouard Mielche (8 August 1905 – 18 February 1969) was a Danish film actor. He appeared in 17 films between 1928 and 1969. He was born in Damsholte, Denmark and died in Denmark.

Selected filmography 
  (1928)
  (1930)
  (1932)
 Elverhøj (1939)
 Affæren Birte (1945)
  (1947)
  (1947)
  (1948)
 Han, Hun, Dirch og Dario (1962)
 Bureauslaven (1964)
  (1964)
 Gertrud (1964)
 Min søsters børn (1966)
 Der var engang (1966)
 Elsk... din næste! (1967)
 Woyzeck (1968)
  (1969)

References

External links 
 

1905 births
1969 deaths
20th-century Danish male actors
Danish male film actors
People from Møn